Julien Rodriguez (born 11 June 1978) is a French former professional footballer who played as a defender.

Career
Born in Béziers, France, Rodriguez started his career at AS Monaco, making 135 appearances for the club and helping them win the Coupe de la Ligue in 2002–03 and reach the 2004 Champions League final. He joined Scottish Premier League club Rangers in August 2005 for £1 million. He scored his first goal for Rangers on 11 March 2006 in Rangers' 4–0 victory over Kilmarnock at Ibrox Stadium and made a total of 30 appearances in his debut season with the club. Having been expected to be an important member of the Rangers team under the management of fellow Frenchman Paul Le Guen in season 2006–07, Le Guen's reign as manager was short and unsuccessful.

After the appointment of Le Guen's replacement Walter Smith in January 2007, Rodriguez was transferred to Marseille.

Rodriguez received a call-up to the France national football team in 2007, but did not play.

References

External links

1978 births
Living people
Sportspeople from Béziers
French footballers
French expatriate footballers
French people of Spanish descent
Association football defenders
FC Istres players
AS Monaco FC players
Rangers F.C. players
Olympique de Marseille players
Ligue 1 players
Scottish Premier League players
Expatriate footballers in Scotland
Footballers from Occitania (administrative region)